Miguel San Román Ferrándiz (born 14 July 1997) is a Spanish footballer who plays for SD Ponferradina as a goalkeeper.

Club career
San Román was born in Benidorm, Alicante, Valencian Community, and was an Atlético Madrid youth graduate. He made his senior debut with the reserves on 20 November 2016, starting in a 1–1 Tercera División home draw against CF Pozuelo de Alarcón.

San Román became a regular starter after the departure of Bernabé Barragán, and renewed his contract until 2021 on 27 March 2018. On 23 July 2019, he was loaned to Segunda División side Elche CF for the season.

San Román made his Elche debut on 17 December 2019, starting in a 2–0 Copa del Rey away defeat of Gimnástica Segoviana CF. Four days later he made his league debut, playing the full 90 minutes in a 1–0 win at Albacete Balompié as starter Édgar Badía was unavailable. Upon returning, he was a third-choice option at Atleti behind Jan Oblak and Ivo Grbić, and made his first team debut on 6 January 2021 by starting in a 0–1 away loss against UE Cornellà, also for the national cup. 

On 11 August 2021, San Román signed a two-year contract with SD Huesca in the second level. After only featuring twice (both cup matches), he moved to fellow league team SD Ponferradina on 20 January 2023.

Personal life
San Román comes from a family of goalkeepers: his father Juan Miguel played for Atleti's reserves before resuming his career in the Segunda División B, while his grand-uncle, also named Miguel, was a first team player during the 1960s. He won 20/21 La Liga Title.

Career statistics

Club

References

External links

1997 births
Living people
People from Benidorm
Sportspeople from the Province of Alicante
Spanish footballers
Footballers from the Valencian Community
Association football goalkeepers
Segunda División players
Segunda División B players
Tercera División players
Atlético Madrid B players
Elche CF players
Atlético Madrid footballers
SD Huesca footballers
SD Ponferradina players